Peter Sjödén (born 14 October 1967) is a Swedish biathlete. He competed in the 20 km individual event at the 1988 Winter Olympics.

References

1967 births
Living people
Swedish male biathletes
Olympic biathletes of Sweden
Biathletes at the 1988 Winter Olympics
People from Älvdalen Municipality
20th-century Swedish people